Wendell Belarmino Pereira (born 20 May 1998) is a Brazilian Paralympic swimmer. He won gold in the 50 metre freestyle S11 in 2020.

References

External links
 

1998 births
Living people
Brazilian male freestyle swimmers
S11-classified Paralympic swimmers
Paralympic swimmers of Brazil
Paralympic gold medalists for Brazil
Paralympic silver medalists for Brazil
Paralympic bronze medalists for Brazil
Paralympic medalists in swimming
Swimmers at the 2020 Summer Paralympics
Medalists at the 2020 Summer Paralympics
Sportspeople from Brasília
21st-century Brazilian people